Annie B. (Bida Ng Ukay-ukay, Bongga siya 'day!) is a 2004 musical and romantic-comedy film released by Viva Films directed by Louie Ignacio. It stars Jolina Magdangal with Dingdong Dantes, Jordan Herrera, Gloria Romero, Amy Austria, and Sarah Geronimo.

The conceptualization and production of the film took almost two years to finish and had multiple delays in theatrical release. In earlier reports (first quarter of 2002), it was reported that Magdangal will co-star with Nora Aunor in a sequel of the 1979 Nora Aunor-starrer Annie Batungbakal to be entitled Anak ni Annie Batungbakal.

After a year, on the second quarter of 2003, the filming started, but despite earlier reports, the final and released Annie B. was entirely different from the 1979 film.

Cast

Main 
 Jolina Magdangal as Anne
 Dingdong Dantes as Fernando
Sarah Geronimo as Patty
 Jordan Herrera as Jasper
Mel Martinez as TJ
Gloria Romero as Lola Karay
Amy Austria as Amelia
Janice de Belen as Millet
Armando Goyena as Alejandro
Ronaldo Valdez as Amado
Bobby Andrews as Alberto
Jazz as Janine
Izza Calzado as Trisha
GJ as Lance
Eagle Riggs as Augie
Mel Kimura as Minerva
Bacci Garcia and Tess Bomb as the Advertising Staff
Mark Bautista as Mark

Reception 
The film received negative reviews from critics and was commercially unsuccessful. According to Ed de Leon of the Philippine Star, the main reason behind the film's commercial failure was the lack of publicity and promotional strategy, saying that the release of the film was as seem kept secret to moviegoers. In another article released a few months earlier, he said that the film's title was also a disadvantage leading to the audience proving that the film was just a re-issue of an earlier released film.

While in an article from the Pilipino Star Ngayon, it was said that the length of the filming and the multiple delays on its theatrical release were the factors that led to its poor box office performance.

Soundtrack

Track listing

Personnel 
Adapted from the Annie B. (Bida Ng Ukay-ukay, Bongga siya 'day!) Original Motion Picture Soundtrack liner notes.

 Jong Azores – album producer
 Vic del Rosario, Jr. – executive producer
 Vincent del Rosario – executive producer
 Eugene Villaluz – associate producer
 Guia Gil-Ferrer – supervising producer
 Eric Carlo Flamiano – poster design
 Samuel S. Samson – album cover lay-out
 Salbakuta – rap lyrics (track 5)
 May Ann Casal Soriano – vocal arrangement and backup vocals (tracks 1, 4)
 Anthony Watson – remix & editing (track 5)

References

External links 
 

Viva Films films
2004 films
Remakes of Philippine films
Philippine comedy-drama films